Trifluorides are compounds in which one atom or ion has three fluorine atoms or ions associated. Many metals form trifluorides, such as iron, the rare-earth elements, and the metals in the aluminium and scandium columns of the periodic table. Most metal trifluorides are poorly soluble in water except Ferric fluoride and Indium(III) fluoride, but several are soluble in other solvents.

List of trifluorides

Actinium trifluoride, AcF3
Aluminium trifluoride
Americium trifluoride, AmF3
Antimony trifluoride, SbF3, sometimes called Swart's reagent
Arsenic trifluoride, AsF3
Bismuth trifluoride, BiF3
Boron trifluoride, BF3, a pungent colourless toxic gas
Bromotrifluoromethane, (carbon monobromide trifluoride)
Bromine trifluoride, BrF3
Carbon trifluoride, C2F6, Hexafluoroethane
Cerium trifluoride, CeF3
Chlorine trifluoride, ClF3
Chromium trifluoride, CrF3
Cobalt trifluoride, CoF3
Curium trifluoride, CmF3
Diethylaminosulfur trifluoride (DAST) is the organosulfur compound with the formula Et2NSF3
Fluoroform, (trifluoromethane)
Gallium trifluoride, GaF3
Gold trifluoride, AuF3
Indium trifluoride, InF3
Iodine trifluoride, IF3, a yellow solid which decomposes above −28 °C
Iron trifluoride, FeF3
Lanthanum trifluoride, LaF3
Manganese trifluoride, MnF3
Neptunium trifluoride, NpF3
Nitrogen trifluoride, NF3, a colorless, toxic, odourless, nonflammable gas
Palladium(II, IV) fluoride
Phosphorus trifluoride, PF3, a colorless and odorless gas
Plutonium trifluoride, PuF3
Promethium trifluoride, PmF3
Rhodium trifluoride, RhF3
Samarium trifluoride, SmF3
Scandium trifluoride, ScF3
Silver trifluoride, AgF3, an unstable, bright-red, diamagnetic compound
Sulfur trifluoride, SF3
Thallium trifluoride, TlF3
Thiazyl trifluoride, NSF3, a stable, colourless gas, and important precursor to other sulfur-nitrogen-fluorine compounds
Thiophosphoryl trifluoride PSF3 colourless gas spontaneously burning with a very cool flame
Titanium trifluoride, TiF3
Uranium trifluoride, UF3
Vanadium trifluoride, VF3
Vanadium(V) oxytrifluoride
Ytterbium trifluoride, YbF3
Yttrium trifluoride, YF3

References

Fluorides